Macrocheilus quadratus is a species of ground beetle in the subfamily Anthiinae. It was described by Zhao & Tian in 2010.

References

Anthiinae (beetle)
Beetles described in 2010